State Trunk Highway 41 (often called Highway 41, STH-41 or WIS 41) was a number assigned to a state highway in the U.S. state of Wisconsin from 1917 to 1926, along the following present-day corridors in 1926:
U.S. Highway 18 from Madison to Milwaukee
U.S. Highway 14 from La Crosse (WI) to Madison. - initially renumbered as Highway 11 until 1933.
For the highway in Wisconsin numbered 41 since 1926, see U.S. Highway 41.

41
U.S. Route 18
U.S. Route 14